Rodrigue Jean (born in Caraquet, New Brunswick) is a Canadian film director, screenwriter, and producer of Acadian origin. He has been a theatre director, dancer and choreographer.

Life and Work 
While pursuing university studies, he developed in the 1980s a practice as a dancer and choreographer. In 1986, he went to Japan to train with Tanaka Min. With Tedi Tafel (choreography and performance), Jacques Perron (photography) and Monique Jean (music), he founded Les Productions de l'Os in 1986. A series of performances resulted from this collaboration, which culminated in 1989 with the creation of his first choregraphed short film, La déroute.

In 1995, he directed a documentary, La voix des rivières, on Acadians of New-Brunswick, with the support of the National Film Board in Acadia, as well as two short fiction films, La mémoire de l'eau (1996), and L'appel/Call Waiting (1998).

Rodrigue Jean then directed three award-winning feature films: the Acadian trilogy Full Blast (1999), Yellowknife (2001) and Lost Song (2008), that earned him the recognition of critics and made his name as a leading filmmaker. In 2005, with the documentary Living on the Edge, he celebrated the work of the Acadian poet Gérald Leblanc.

During a stay in London in the early 1990s, he worked as a theatre director. He also organised video workshops at Streetwise Youth, a sex worker centre in London (1991–98). Between 2005 and 2007, after several decades trying to fund this project, he directed the documentary Men for Sale, offering a striking portrait of sex workers in downtown Montreal. In 2009, he founded Epopée, a film action group born out of a co-creation project with the participants of Men for Sale. With Epopée, he deepened his engagement with sex workers, in collaboration with the organization RÉZO.

This collective work, composed of documentaries and fiction films, led to the creation of the installation L’État des lieux (2012), and two feature films, L’État du moment (2012) and L’État du monde (2012). Deepening his research into misrepresented lives, and in continuation with Men for Sale and Epopée, he directed in 2014 the fiction feature Love in the Time of Civil War.

Besides the project on masculine sex work, the collective launched the installation Fractions, presented at the Cinémathèque Québécoise in 2016, and the triptych Insurgence (2013), Rupture (2016), and Contrepoint (2016) on the great political and social movement launched by the 2012 Quebec Student Strike. Epopée also worked on the massive incarceration of Indigenous women in Canada, with the installation The Reappearance of Sheri Pranteau (2018), which was presented as a triptych at the Joliette Museum of Art.

His latest feature film, The Acrobat, was released in 2020.

Navigating between documentary and fiction, often mixing genres, and combining ethics and aesthetics, Rodrigue Jean develops a cinematic practice, either by representing people who are deprived of a voice, or by inventing characters driven by their impulses and their desires. Through these two practices of cinema, he examines and questions the constructions of identity and sexuality that stand up against the imperatives of any form of normativity.

Filmography
Director
1989: La Déroute (short film)
1995: La voix des rivières (documentary)
1996: La mémoire de l’eau (documentary)
1998: Call Waiting (L'Appel) (short video)
1999: Full Blast
2002: Yellowknife
2005: Living on the Edge (L'extrême frontière, l'œuvre poétique de Gérald Leblanc)(documentary)
2008: Lost Song
2009: Men for Sale (Hommes à louer)
2012: L'État du moment - Épopée Group
 2013: L'État du monde - Épopée Group
 2013: Insurgence - Épopée Group
2014: Love in the Time of Civil War (L'amour au temps de la guerre civile)
2016: Rupture — Épopée Group 
2019: The Acrobat (L'Acrobate)

Producer
2002: Yellowknife
2008: Lost Song

Writer
2002: Yellowknife
2008: Lost Song

Actor
1991: Letters of Transit (Les Sauf-conduits)

Web 

 2010-2012: Épopée - Travailleurs du sexe - Épopée Group

Installations 

 2012: L'état des lieux — Épopée Group
2016: Fraction — Épopée Group
2018: Sheri Pranteau: Undisappeared — Épopée Group

Stage Direction 

 1991: Wolf Boy by Brad Fraser 
 1992: Antony and Cleopatra
 1993: Romeo and Juliet
 1993: Macbeth
1993: The Ei (from Funeral Rites by Jean Genet)
1994: The Eve (from Funeral Rites by Jean Genet)

Choreography and Performance 

 1985: Spirit 1
 1985: Duet for One Man and One Woman
 1985: Horse
 1985: Untitled
 1985: Oh No
 1986: Étude 1
 1986: Spirit 11
 1986: Spirit 111
 1987: Études
 1987: Les Paroles de l’autre
 1987: Places Are the Only Things You Can Trust
 1998: Passages
 1998: Travail inintéressant

Retrospectives 

 2009: Festival d'Avignon, France
2012: Cinémathèque québécoise, Canada

Awards
1995: La Voix des rivières, Telefilm Canada Prize for Best Medium-Length Canadian film, Festival international du cinéma francophone en Acadie (FICFA)
1996: La mémoire de l’eau, Best Documentary, Atlantic Film Festival in Halifax, Nova Scotia 
1999: Full Blast, Special Jury Citation for the Best Canadian First Feature Film Award, Toronto International Film Festival
2002: Yellowknife, Critic's Choice for Best Québec Film, Association québécoise des critiques de cinéma (AQCC)
2008: Lost Song, Best Canadian Feature Film, Toronto International Film Festival

References

External links

Rodrigue Jean at Media Queer

1957 births
Canadian documentary film producers
Canadian screenwriters in French
Canadian choreographers
Canadian contemporary dancers
Canadian documentary film directors
Living people
Acadian people
Acadian film
People from Caraquet
LGBT film directors
Canadian LGBT screenwriters
Canadian gay writers
Film directors from Montreal
Writers from Montreal
Canadian male dancers
20th-century Canadian screenwriters
21st-century Canadian screenwriters
Canadian male screenwriters
Film directors from New Brunswick
Writers from New Brunswick
Gay screenwriters
Film producers from New Brunswick
21st-century Canadian LGBT people
20th-century Canadian LGBT people